Cychrus seriatus is a species of ground beetle in the subfamily of Carabinae. It was described by Roeschke in 1907.

seriatus
Beetles described in 1907